The 2011 NASCAR Corona Series was the eighth season of the Corona Series and was organized by NASCAR Mexico. The season was composed by fourteen races in seven venues across Mexico. The season started in Monterrey with the Regia 200, and finished in Mexico City in the Mexico Fest 200. Six drivers won races being Homero Richards the most winner with five. Mónica Morales won the owners championship for third time and Germán Quiroga successful defend his championship, winning his third championship. Enrique Contreras III won the Rookie of the Year title.

Report

The kickoff of the season was in Monterrey. This was the 100th race of the NCS. Patrick Goeters dominated the race from start, and won his fourth race in his career. In the second race, Jorge Goeters won his 10th race, and the fourth in this track. Goeters together with Germán Quiroga shared the leading. The race was shortened by time, originally was scheduled to 250 laps (201 km). The third race in Aguascalientes saw to Rogelio López started from the back of the grid, because to failed the inspection after the qualification, but he took the victory. Germán Quiroga became in the leader of NCS. In Chiapas, Jorge Goeters took his first victory of the season in a race with 10 cautions. The race was shortened of 200 laps to 129 laps by time. Again Homero Richards took the first place in the fifth race. This was the first of fourth wins in a row that finished in San Luis Potosí.

In the second part of the season, Rafael Martínez won in his hometown. For Martínez was his 15th victory, he took the historic second place. But, soon Quiroga reached the 15th victory in the next race and two more before the end of the season. This last victory marked the third championship for Quiroga.

Teams and drivers

Driver changes
 Freddy Tame leave Team GP, and joined 2b Racing taking the place of Ricardo Pérez de Lara.

2011 calendar

The schedule was presented on March 8 with 14 races in 7 venues.

Calendar changes

Guadalajara was exclude for the season because the damage in the track of the Trióvalo Bernardo Obregón.
The second race in Chiapas was changed to San Luis Potosí, because of damage in the track.

Results and standings

Races

Driver standings

(key) Bold - Pole position awarded by time. Italics - Pole position set by final practice results or rainout. * – Most laps led.

 Jorge Contreras, Jr. had finished in 32, but he was disqualified after the technical inspection.
 Herrero had finished in 29, but he was disqualified, because he did not present his carburetor to inspection.
 Montaño got a penalty of 50 points for an engine irregularity.
 Carlos Contreras got a penalty of 15 points for an steering wheel irregularity.
 All drivers that did not qualify for the race received championship points.

Rookie of the Year

Only the best 10 results count in the final classification.

See also
2011 NASCAR Sprint Cup Series
2011 NASCAR Nationwide Series
2011 NASCAR Camping World Truck Series
2011 NASCAR Canadian Tire Series
2011 NASCAR Stock V6 Series

References

NASCAR Corona Series

NASCAR Mexico Series